Diechomma is a genus of South American dwarf spiders that was first described by Alfred Frank Millidge in 1991.  it contains only two species, both found in Colombia: D. exiguum and D. pretiosum.

See also
 List of Linyphiidae species

References

Araneomorphae genera
Linyphiidae
Spiders of South America